Ishmukhametovo (İşmöxämät) is a rural locality (a village) in Bala-Chetyrmansky Selsoviet, Fyodorovsky District, Bashkortostan, Russia. The population was 73 as of 2010. There is 1 street.

Geography 
Ishmukhametovo is located 34 km east of Fyodorovka (the district's administrative centre) by road. Polyakovka is the nearest rural locality.

References 

Rural localities in Fyodorovsky District